Yeranos is a village in the Martuni Municipality of the Gegharkunik Province of Armenia.

History 
The church of St. Astvatsatsin in the village dates back to 1215, and the village also contains Tukh Manuk and St. Sofia shrines. Following the Gavar-Martuni road, near the chicken farm, are the remains of a cyclopean fort.

Gallery

References

External links 

 World Gazeteer: Armenia – World-Gazetteer.com
 
 

Populated places in Gegharkunik Province